Keough may refer to:

Keough (surname)

Fictional characters 

Joe Keough, in a novel by Robert J. Randisi
Keough, in film Dark_Blue
Keough/Haze, in anime Ragnarok the Animation
"Robby" Keough, in film Outbreak

Other 
Bishop Keough Regional High School
Keough Award
Keough Hall, Notre Dame
Seton Keough High School

See also 
Kehoe (disambiguation)
Keogh (disambiguation)
Keoghan (surname)
Keohane (disambiguation)
McKeogh
McKeough (disambiguation)